Greene County Technical School District (Greene County Tech.) is a public school district based in Paragould, Arkansas, United States. The school district encompasses  of land, including portions of Greene County, Randolph County, Craighead County, and Clay County. 

Within Greene County it serves the southern portion of Paragould and the municipality of Delaplaine. The portion of Paragould in the district makes up . Within Randolph County it serves O Kean. Within Clay County it serves Peach Orchard. It also serves the unincorporated Greene County areas of Beech Grove, Evening Star, Light, Lorado, Mounds, and Walcott.

The district and its five schools provide comprehensive education for more than 3,600 pre-kindergarten through grade 12 students and is accredited by the Arkansas Department of Education (ADE).

History 

It was established on September 17, 1947, and originated from the Greene County Rural School District.

On July 1, 2004 the Delaplaine School District consolidated into the Greene County Tech School District.

In the 2000’s, passed multiple villages to pay for their athletics.

Schools 
 Greene County Tech High School, located in Paragould and serving more than 700 students in grades 10 through 12.
 Greene County Tech Junior High School, located in Paragould and serving more than 500 students in grades 8 and 9.
 Greene County Tech Intermediate School, located in Paragould and serving more than 500 students in grades 6 and 7.
 Greene County Tech Elementary School, located in Paragould and serving more than 900 students in grades 3 through 5.
 Greene County Tech Primary School, located in Paragould and serving more than 900 students in pre-kindergarten through grade 2.

The district previously operated Delaplaine Elementary School (K-6) and Delaplaine High School (7-12) after the merger with the Delaplaine district; these schools served the area of the former Delaplaine district. The Delaplaine schools closed in 2007. Delaplaine mayor Larry Myrick stated that the community lost children with families after the school stopped operations.

See also 

 Marmaduke School District
 Paragould School District

References

Further reading
Maps of the district and predecessor school districts:
 2004-2005 School District Map
 Map of Arkansas School Districts pre-July 1, 2004
 (Download)
 (Download)
 (Download)
 (Download)

External links 
 

School districts in Arkansas
Education in Clay County, Arkansas
Education in Craighead County, Arkansas
Education in Greene County, Arkansas
Education in Randolph County, Arkansas
Paragould, Arkansas
1947 establishments in Arkansas
School districts established in 1947